Acta Informatica is a peer-reviewed scientific journal publishing original research papers in computer science.

The journal is known mostly for publications in theoretical computer science. One of the two 1988 papers awarded the Gödel Prize in 1995 has appeared in this journal.

The editor-in-chief is Henning Fernau (Universität Trier). According to the Journal Citation Reports, the journal had a 2021 impact factor of 0.871.

References

External links
 

Publications established in 1971
Springer Science+Business Media academic journals
Computer science journals
English-language journals
Formal methods publications
8 times per year journals